This is a list of some of the highest-selling magazine cover issues. It does not take into consideration centerfolds and posters. It includes any type of magazine and single special editions. Groupings are based on over 3 million newsstands copies and distribution.

Considered "The Greatest Magazine Ever Published" by David Plotz, Life magazine figures sold the most amount for decades, with a weekly circulation of 4 million copies and over 10 million readers in their prime, then-10 percent of U.S population. In recent years, People became weekly's highest-seller, and various single issues reached over 2 million copies.

List of highest-selling singles magazine cover issues

See also 
 List of magazines by circulation
 List of best-selling sheet music
 List of most expensive photographs
 List of most expensive celebrity photographs
 List of most expensive books and manuscripts

References 

Lists of magazines
Lists of bestsellers